Ruslan Zhaparov (born 27 May 1996) is a Kazakh heavyweight taekwondo competitor. He represented Kazakhstan at the 2016 Summer Olympics in Rio de Janeiro, in the men's +80 kg. He was defeated by Azerbaijan's Radik Isaev in the round of 16 and South Korea's Cha Dong-min in the repechages.  Zhaparov was the flag bearer for Kazakhstan during the Parade of Nations.

In 2018 Zhaparov won a bronze medal at the Asian Games and a silver at the Asian Championships.

References

External links

 

1996 births
Living people
Kazakhstani male taekwondo practitioners
Olympic taekwondo practitioners of Kazakhstan
Taekwondo practitioners at the 2016 Summer Olympics
Taekwondo practitioners at the 2018 Asian Games
Medalists at the 2018 Asian Games
Asian Games medalists in taekwondo
Asian Games bronze medalists for Kazakhstan
Asian Taekwondo Championships medalists
Taekwondo practitioners at the 2020 Summer Olympics
People from Taraz
21st-century Kazakhstani people